Sup de Co Marrakech (also École supérieure de commerce de Marrakech) is a private five year college based in Marrakech, Morocco. It was founded in 1987.

Since 2006 the college started a master's degree in business in partnership with Sup de Co Grenoble, France.

The school is affiliated to École supérieure de commerce de Toulouse of France.

Partnerships
Since 1995, the school started to build many partnership programs with international institutions like:

 University of Delaware, Newark, Delaware
 University of St. Thomas, Houston, Texas
 Oklahoma State University, Oklahoma City
 National-Louis University, Chicago, Illinois
 Drexel University, Philadelphia, Pennsylvania
 Elmhurst College, Elmhurst, Illinois
 Temple University, Philadelphia, Pennsylvania
 UQAM, Montreal, Quebec, Canada
 University of Houston, Houston,Texas

External links
Official Blog "EX Student" of Sup de Co Marrakech
Official website of La VieEco de l'enseignement supérieur
Official website of Sup de Co Marrakech
Official website of Sup de Co Toulouse

Business schools in Morocco
Buildings and structures in Marrakesh
Educational institutions established in 1987
1987 establishments in Morocco
20th-century architecture in Morocco